Citreitalea is a Gram-negative, strictly aerobic and rod-shaped  genus of bacteria from the family of Flavobacteriaceae with one known species (Citreitalea marina). Citreitalea marina has been isolated from the marine alga Chondrus ocellatus.

References

Flavobacteria
Bacteria genera
Monotypic bacteria genera
Taxa described in 2014